Graphium eurous, the sixbar swordtail, is a swallowtail butterfly belonging to the genus Graphium, also known as the swordtails.

Description
All the bands are narrowed, being only blackish stripes on a pale yellow transparent ground, the anal area of the hindwing being alone more strongly coloured, bearing a honey-yellow anal spot which is somewhat constricted in the middle; behind this spot there is a blue-centred dot, which represents the anal ocellus.

Range
It is known along the Himalayas west from northern Pakistan into India (including Jammu & Kashmir, Himachal Pradesh, Garhwal and Kumaon, Sikkim, Assam, Manipur), Nepal, northern Myanmar extending into south-western and central China; and Taiwan.

Status
Though overall common and not threatened, it tends to be extremely local.

Taxonomy
Graphium eurous belongs to the subgenus Pazala. It has a number of subspecies:
G. e. eurous Leech 1893 - Along the central and eastern Himalayas from Nepal west to North Bengal, Sikkim, possibly Bhutan, Assam, Manipur across northern and central Myanmar to Yunnan.
G. e. caschmirensis (Rothschild, 1895) - Western Himalayas from Jammu & Kashmir to Himachal Pradesh and Uttarakhand.
G. e. sikkimica (Heron, 1895) - Northern West Bengal, Sikkim, Arunachal Pradesh, Nagaland, Manipur and Meghalaya. Also Nepal.
G. e. inthanon Katayama, 1986 - Northern Thailand and Laos.
G. e. panopaea (de Nicéville, 1900) - Western China.
G. e. meridionalis (Mell 1935) - Southeast China (Northern Guandong to Zhejiang).
G. e. melli Racheli & Cotton 2009 - Guanxi, southern China.
G. e. asakurae (Matsumura, 1908) - Taiwan.

Habitat
They inhabit certain small localities and are always to be found there.

Habits
While the male swordtails are rarely away from their favourite spots, the females wander abroad in search of their host plants, the laurels.

The males generally fly high up, often around a selected tree, where they can be seen settling now and then well out of reach. Occasionally, they descend close to the ground where they can be netted. The females, being less lively, fly closer to the ground, and are often found settling on their host plants.

Life cycle
This species is single brooded. It regularly emerges in Himachal Pradesh area in mid-April and stays on the wing till mid-May. The brood emerges slightly earlier east of Himachal till in Assam the butterflies appear as early as January.

Usually, the females emerge much later than the males and it is not uncommon to see fresh females with wings in perfect condition being courted by males with tattered wings.

Caterpillar
The caterpillars are greenish and have black dots. It has a yellow transverse band. Each thoracic segment has a pair of spines. The anal processes are yellow and have a black tip.

Pupa
The pupas are slender, green and have four yellowish lines.

Food plants
The larval food plants of the sixbar swordtail are primarily from family Lauraceae. Haribal lists Persea odoratissima and Michelia doltsopa (family Magnoliaceae) as the larval host plants. Smetacek (2012) has reared larvae found to be feeding on Persea duthei King ex J.D. Hooker and Neolitsea umbrosa (Nees) Gamble, to adulthood.

See also
Papilionidae
List of butterflies of India
List of butterflies of India (Papilionidae)

References

 
 
 
 
 
 

Fauna of Pakistan
eurous
Butterflies of Asia
Butterflies of Indochina
Butterflies described in 1893